Think Free is the sixth studio album by American rapper Freeway. The album was released on June 22, 2018, by New Rothchilds, LLC and Roc Nation.

Track listing
 Credits adapted from liner notes.

Personnel
 David Rivera - engineering
 Sam Croce - engineering
 Khalil Wilson - engineering
 JF Pierre - engineering
 Mike Jerz - engineering, mixing
 Pop Traxx - engineering
 Vidal Davis - engineering, mixing, mastering
 Freeway - executive producer
 Sherman Byers - executive producer
 Marc Byers - executive producer
 Jason Carbonell - A&R
 Leota Blackburn - marketing
 Michelle Lukianovich - art direction, design
 Jabari Jacobs - photography

References

2018 albums
Freeway (rapper) albums